XHTNC-FM is a community radio station on 105.1 FM in Tancítaro, Michoacán. It is known as Radio Cultural Tancítaro.

History
Radio Cultural Tancítaro began operations formally on April 24, 2014 as the first station in town, signing on during the Third Annual Avocado Fair. The unlicensed station broadcast on 107.1 MHz. A lightning strike and lack of resources had the station off air as of June 15, 2016.

XHTNC-FM, on its new frequency of 105.1, was among the last new stations approved in 2017, getting Federal Telecommunications Institute approval on December 13 and signing on within two weeks.

References

Radio stations in Michoacán
Radio stations established in 2014
Community radio stations in Mexico
2014 establishments in Mexico